Sigismund Casimir Vasa (1 April 1640 – 9 August 1647), was a Polish prince and the only legitimate son of King Ladislaus IV and his first wife Queen Cecilia Renata. He was named after his grandfather Sigismund III, and uncle John Casimir.

Biography
He was raised by the governess Rozyna Małgorzata von Eckenberg. As he was an only child, he was the almost certain candidate as the successor of Ladislaus IV. The French traveller, Le Laboureur described him as a child: extremely vivid, lean and agile. He was also seen as being quick-minded, he was a fast learner, and by the age of seven, he was fluent in not only Polish but German too, and made good progress in Latin. The prince willingly dressed in the Polish fashion, which still further strengthened his position as candidate and endeared him to the Poles themselves. In fact, when someone scolded him in German, he replied in Polish "...I am a Pole, so talk to me in Polish".

In the summer of 1647, the boy suddenly fell ill. According to some, it came from overeating certain fruits, while others claimed that he contracted dysentery from the Pomeranian voivode, Gerhard Dönhoff (1590–1648). After five days of pain and bloody diarrhoea, the young prince died. With the death of his only legitimate son, Ladislaus IV's grief was so great, he did not even attend the funeral, held in Krakow, where the young prince was buried at Wawel Cathedral.

Notes

References
Władysław Czapliński: the court of Władysław IV, Warsaw, 1959.
Bozena Fabiani: Life at the Royal Palace in the era of the Vasa, Publisher "Volumen", Warsaw,1996.

1640 births
1647 deaths
Polish princes
17th-century Polish people
House of Vasa
Heirs apparent who never acceded
Burials at Wawel Cathedral
Royalty and nobility who died as children
Sons of kings